Alexandru Mironescu (July 23, 1903–January 20, 1973) was a Romanian prose writer.

Born in Tecuci, his parents were Victor Mironescu and his wife Elena. After attending Dimitrie Cantemir High School in Bucharest, he obtained degrees in chemistry and philosophy from the University of Bucharest. He later obtained a doctorate in science from the Sorbonne and one in philosophy at Bucharest. From 1929, he was a lecturer at the latter university and a teacher at Saint Sava National College. He was editor at Semnalul newspaper. Mironescu's first journalistic contribution appeared in Credința newspaper in 1935; exploring both domestic and foreign affairs, he neither commented on daily events as such, nor held firm to a particular ideology, but took the stance of an independent observer, condemning the intellectual elites' isolation with regard to the national, socioeconomic and cultural interest.

Mironescu's first book was the 1937 novel Oamenii nimănui. His work appeared in Evenimentul zilei, Fapta, Familia, Azi, Țara noastră, Vremea and Revista Fundațiilor Regale. He also wrote the novel Destrămare (1939), the unpublished play Joc în umbră and a few philosophical works. He authored a number of organic chemistry textbooks and treatises, and translated André Gide's Retour de l'U.R.S.S..

A devoted practitioner of hesychasm, Mironescu was, from 1945 to 1948 and again from 1953 to 1958, an adherent of the "Burning Bush"( Rugul Aprins) group within the Romanian Orthodox Church. He stopped publishing after the advent of the Communist regime, and in 1958, together with his son, was arrested for his clandestine religious activity. Sentenced to twenty years' imprisonment, he was freed in 1963. Even in 1968, at the height of Nicolae Ceaușescu's popularity, he confided in his diary that he viewed the regime as disastrous and doomed to fall.

Notes

1903 births
1973 deaths
People from Tecuci
Members of the Romanian Orthodox Church
University of Bucharest alumni
Romanian novelists
Romanian newspaper editors
Romanian schoolteachers
Romanian textbook writers
Romanian translators
Romanian chemists
Romanian anti-communists
Romanian prisoners and detainees
Prisoners and detainees of Romania
Members of the Romanian Academy of Sciences
20th-century translators